The 1981 Asia Golf Circuit was the 20th season of golf tournaments that comprised the Asia Golf Circuit. 

Taiwan's Lu Hsi-chuen was the circuit champion, ahead of compatriot Ho Ming-chung and Americans, Payne Stewart and Tom Sieckmann. With the title, Lu also gained exemption into the U.S. Open; he and Ho gained entry into the World Series of Golf; and all four gained invitations to The Open Championship.

In 1978, Papua New Guinea had joined the Asian Golf Confederation with the intention of adding a tournament to the circuit in 1980. These plans were postponed and the tournament was then provisionally scheduled to start the 1981 season, but Papua New Guinea withdrew from the circuit later in the year.

After several years of the Indian Open clashing with the Malaysian Dunlop Masters, the Malaysian Golf Association managed to get the organisers, Dunlop Malaysia, to agree to reschedule their event. However, the organisers of the Rolex Masters in Singapore controversially then organised their tournament for the same dates.

Tournament schedule
The table below shows the 1981 Asian Golf Circuit schedule. With the abandonment of plans for a tournament in Papua New Guinea, there were no changes from the 1980 schedule, with the order of the tournaments also remaining the same.

Final standings
The Asia Golf Circuit operated a points based system to determine the overall circuit champion, with points being awarded in each tournament to the leading players. In 1981 point allocations were changed, with 120 points available to the winner at each tournament, up from 20 in 1980. At the end of the season, the player with the most points was declared the circuit champion, and there was a prize pool to be shared between the top players in the points table.

References

Asia Golf Circuit
Asia Golf Circuit